Bido may refer to:

Bido (Dragon Ball Z), a character in the anime film Dragon Ball Z: Bojack Unbound
Bido (Fullmetal Alchemist), a character in the manga series Fullmetal Alchemist

People with the surname
Antonio Bido (born 1949), Italian film director
Cándido Bidó (1936–2011), Dominican Republic artist

See also
Bidos, a commune of Pyrénées-Atlantiques, France